Moi Center is a complex of three buildings in Shenyang, China.

See also
List of tallest buildings in Shenyang
List of tallest buildings in China

References

Commercial buildings completed in 2013
Skyscrapers in Shenyang
2013 establishments in China
Residential skyscrapers in China